Heros efasciatus is a species of tropical freshwater cichlid native to the Amazon basin in South America. It is commonly found in the aquarium trade, often in its gold colored variation rather than the wild-type olive green one.

Diet
Heros efasciatus is one of the few cichlid species that act a regular frugivore, quite notably during the wet season when riparian zones become inundated with water.

Concerns

Over the past few years, popularity of Heros efasciatus within the aquarium trade has increased. Consequently, this species could be susceptible to over-exploitation, primarily because of their natural low densities and low fecundity.

References

Cichlid fish of South America
efasciatus
Fish described in 1840
Taxa named by Johann Jakob Heckel